Linder is a river of Bavaria, Germany. It flows into the Ammer near Oberammergau.

See also
List of rivers of Bavaria

Rivers of Bavaria
Ammergau Alps
Rivers of Germany